Thomas MacPartlin (1879 – 20 October 1923) was an Irish Labour Party politician. He was a member of Seanad Éireann from 1922 to 1923. A trade union official from County Sligo, he was a member of the Amalgamated Society of Carpenters and Joiners union and served as the president of the Irish Trades Union Congress in 1917. He was elected to the Free State Seanad for 9 years at the 1922 election. He died in office in October 1923, and a by-election held on 28 November 1923 to fill the vacancy was won by Thomas Foran of the Labour Party.

References

 

1879 births
1923 deaths
Labour Party (Ireland) senators
Members of the 1922 Seanad
Irish trade unionists
People from County Sligo